The Karakalpak Autonomous Soviet Socialist Republic (Karakalpak ASSR; Karakalpak: Қарақалпақстан АССР, Qaraqalpaqstan ASSR; , Qoraqalpog‘iston ASSR; , Karakalpakskaya ASSR), also known as Soviet Karakalpakstan or simply Karakalpakstan, was an autonomous republic within the Soviet Union. Until 20 July 1932, it was called the Karakalpak Autonomous Oblast. On 5 December 1936, it was moved from the Russian SFSR to the Uzbek SSR. It was the only ASSR in Soviet Central Asia (though other ASSRs existed in the region prior to the Karakalpak ASSR's creation, such as the Tajik ASSR and the Kirghiz ASSR, both of which were "upgraded" to union-level republics in 1929 and 1936 respectively).

Its capital was Nukus (until 1939, Turtkul).

On 14 December 1990, Karakalpak ASSR declared state sovereignty over the Soviet laws. Uzbekistan declared independence on 31 August 1991 after the events of the failed coup while Karakalpak ASSR was renamed to and re-established as the Republic of Karakalpakstan on 21 December 1991. The Soviet Union was dissolved on 26 December 1991.

The new constitution was adopted on 8 December 1992, thus making Karakalpakstan as an autonomous republic within Uzbekistan.

Demographics
Demographic change and ethnic composition of the population of Karakalpakstan according to the data of the 1926-1989 censuses

Flags

See also
First Secretary of the Karakalpak Communist Party

References

States and territories established in 1932
Autonomous republics of the Soviet Union
Uzbek Soviet Socialist Republic
Former socialist republics
1932 establishments in the Soviet Union
1992 disestablishments in Uzbekistan